The Koki 200 is a type of container flatcar operated by JR Freight, designed to haul two 20-foot tank containers or one 40-foot container. The first cars of this type were delivered in 1999, and have a capacity of 48 tonnes with an overall length of 15m. The cars are designed to carry two containers up to 24 tons each or a single container of up to 30.48 tons. They are unable to load the domestic 12 foot Japanese containers. All cars in the series are painted red with gray trucks.

References

Rolling stock of Japan
Japan Freight Railway Company